Borrentin is a municipality in the Mecklenburgische Seenplatte district, in Mecklenburg-Western Pomerania, Germany. Seat of the Amt Borrentin until 2004, it is now part of the Amt Demmin-Land. The highway B194 goes through the municipality. The main economical activity in Borrentin is agriculture. Other businesses are small in size.

References